Todd Reynolds may refer to:
 Todd Reynolds (musician), American violinist, composer, and conductor
 Todd Reynolds (figure skater) (born 1966), American figure skater